Maccabi Cernăuți was a Jewish football club from Chernivtsi, Austria Hungary

History
During the interwar period participated in regional championships. At the end of the 1926–27 season, they became for the first time regional champions, and participated in the Divizia A national championship. They were eliminated in the preliminary round when they played with Mihai Viteazul Chișinău.

Preliminary Round(Eights of finals)

In late 20s, it merged with the other team Hakoah Cernăuți, to form a more competitive team, twice becoming regional champions and participated in the national championship, in the seasons 1930–31 and 1931–32.

1930–31 Semifinals

1931–32 Semifinals

Honours
Liga I
Semifinals(2): 1930–31, 1931–32

References

1909 establishments in Austria-Hungary
1941 disestablishments in Romania
Football clubs in Chernivtsi Oblast
Defunct football clubs in Romania
Association football clubs established in 1909
Association football clubs disestablished in 1941